Blue Divide is the second album by singer-songwriter Richard Shindell.  It was released in 1995 by Shanachie Records.  Shanachie also released a live promo CD, Scenes from a Blue Divide (Live) and More which included five live tracks recorded at the Treestar Coffeehouse in Mount Kisco, New York.<ref name=amg2>Meyer, Richard, [ "Review: Scenes from a Blue Divide (Live) and More"], Allmusic</ref>

Joan Baez covered the song "Fishing" on the album Gone from Danger''.

Track listing 
All songs by Richard Shindell except where noted
 "A Summer Wind, A Cotton Dress"
 "Fishing"
 "The Ballad of Mary Magdalene"
 "Lazy"
 "The Things That I Have Seen"
 "TV Light" (Addabbo, Shindell)
 "A Tune for Nowhere"
 "Arrowhead"
 "Ascent"
 "Blue Divide"

Personnel 
Musicians:
 Richard Shindell – vocals, acoustic guitar, high-strung guitar, harmony, cittern
 Steve Addabbo – Hammond organ, electric guitar
 Kenneth Blevins – drums
 Larry Campbell – lap steel, pedal steel, mandolin
 Séamus Egan – mandolin, uilleann pipes
 Peter Freeman – synthesizer
 Mark Hamza – Hammond organ
 Lucy Kaplansky – harmony
 Juan Patiño – percussion
 Dave Richards – bass
 Michael Visceglia – bass
 John Whelan – button accordion

Production
 Produced by Steve Addabbo
 Recorded and mixed at Shelter Island Sound, New York City

References

External links 
 Blue Divide page at richardshindell.com

1995 albums
Richard Shindell albums
Albums produced by Steve Addabbo